Victor Antonescu (July 16, 1936 in Bucharest, Romania) is a Romanian animation film director.

Main films

 Robinson Crusoe (a.k.a. Il racconto della giungla) with Italian director Gibba in 1974.
 Aventuri submarine (in English Submarine Adventures) in 1978.
 Uimitoarele aventuri ale muschetarilor (in English The amazing adventures of the musketeers) two series, in 1986 and in 1990.

External links
 Victor Antonescu at Cinemagia

Romanian film directors
Living people
1936 births